Stefan Ołdak (5 November 1904 – 20 October 1969) was a Polish sprinter. He competed in the men's 400 metres at the 1924 Summer Olympics.

References

External links
 

1904 births
1969 deaths
Athletes (track and field) at the 1924 Summer Olympics
Polish male sprinters
Polish male middle-distance runners
Olympic athletes of Poland
Athletes from Warsaw
People from Warsaw Governorate
20th-century Polish people